The Cessna CitationJet/CJ/M2 (also known as the Model 525) are a series of light business jets built by Cessna, and are part of the Citation family.
Launched in October 1989, the first flight of the Model 525 was on April 29, 1991.  Federal Aviation Administration (FAA) certification was awarded on October 16, 1992, and the first aircraft was delivered on March 30, 1993.

The CJ series are powered by two Williams FJ44  engines; the design uses the Citation II's forward fuselage with a new carry-through section wing and a T-tail.

The original CitationJet model has been updated into the CJ1/CJ1+/M2 variants; additionally, the CJ1 was stretched into the CJ2/CJ2+  which was built between 2000 and 2016. The design was then further developed into the CJ3/CJ3+, built from December 2004 to present, and finally into the CJ4 which has been built since 2010. By June 2017, 2,000 of all variants had been delivered.

Development

Development of the CitationJet was prompted by the 1985 discontinuation of the Citation I, a reaction to the increasing price of its Pratt & Whitney JT15D-1 engines, which rendered it uncompetitive with its larger straight wing Citation stablemates. Cessna believed that a substantial market still existed for a light 4-5 passenger jet with low operating costs, docile flying qualities, and the ability to operate from short runways usable by light piston twins, a formula that had made the Citation I successful. However, that aircraft had been stigmatized for its slower cruise speed than its competitors, which had progressively been addressed in the Citation S/II and Bravo and the Citation V, Ultra and Encore, but at the cost of operating economy. To offer increased speed with reduced purchase and operating costs, Cessna engineers realized that a new, lighter airframe design would be needed, using less expensive and lower-thrust engines. To better compete with newer jets, Cessna also wanted to eliminate the step in the center aisle of the earlier Citations, created by the spar passing through the cabin.

Cessna launched the $2.4 million (equivalent to $ million in ) model 525 CitationJet at the October 1989 NBAA convention in Atlanta, estimating a demand for 1,000 aircraft over ten years.
Succeeding the 700 original Citation Is produced since 1972, first flight was scheduled for spring 1991, Federal Aviation Administration (FAA) certification in October 1992 and deliveries by the end of the year.

Its first flight was on April 29, 1991, FAA certification was awarded on October 16, 1992, and first delivery happened on March 30, 1993. The aircraft met its initial design goal: its normal cruise speed was  faster than that of the Citation I, and it outperformed that aircraft in all other significant metrics except maximum payload and approach noise, despite having  less total engine thrust. Twenty years after its first flight, 1,450 CJs had been produced. 

As of June 2017, 2,000 of all variants had been delivered, with five million hours flown.

Design
The six-seat CitationJet is a monoplane with a cantilever wing, a retractable tricycle landing gear and a pressurized cabin.

The jet uses the Citation II's forward fuselage, a new carry-through section, a new laminar flow, supercritical wing developed with NASA and Boeing, and a T-tail.
Powered by two  Williams FJ44s, the  aircraft has a trailing link undercarriage for smooth landings, and can be flown by a single pilot.

The CitationJet retains the  inside diameter, circular fuselage cross-section of the Citation I and II, a semi-monocoque construction of conventional aluminum alloys assembled with rivets, fasteners and adhesive bonding.
To reduce interference drag, a large fairing encases the low wing center section, and the engines are mounted high on the tail. Composite materials save weight in non-load-bearing components including fairings and the nose radome. The cockpit side windows are slightly smaller than those on earlier Citations to lessen interior temperature differences between the cockpit and the main cabin.

Wing structure is a conventional ladder with chord-wise ribs over front and rear spars, and an aft sub spar to support the landing gear.   
The NASA high-speed 0213 airfoil sustains natural laminar flow over 30% of the upper surface for 10-15% better lift-to-drag ratio than the larger NACA 23000-series wing of the Citation I. To maintain the wing's laminar-flow qualities and reduce weight, icing protection is provided by ducted bleed air rather than the deicing boots or fluid deicing systems used on earlier Citations.

Its FJ44 engine has a 16:1 overall pressure ratio and a 2.58:1 bypass ratio. Early CitationJet models have a novel design feature to reduce weight: rather than conventional thrust reversers, the aircraft are equipped with thrust attenuator paddles that pivot from the rear fuselage, similar to those used on the Cessna T-37 Tweet military trainer.

Variants

Model 525
CitationJet
Model 525 serial numbers 0001 to 0359, powered by Williams FJ44-1A turbofans, are marketed as the CitationJet.

CitationJet CJ1
Model 525 serial numbers 0360 to 0599 are marketed as the CitationJet CJ1 and are powered by the same Williams FJ44-1A. It was improved with a Pro Line 21 avionics suite, and a moderate increase in maximum takeoff weight.
CitationJet CJ1+
Model 525 serial number 0600 and higher are marketed as CitationJet CJ1+ and are powered by Williams FJ44-1AP turbofans. With the same airframe, it has Pro Line 21 avionics package and FADEC engine control. It was certified in 2005.
 The GE Honda HF120 engine was announced as a retrofit option for the CJ/CJ1/CJ1+ in 2014.

Citation M2
Model 525s marketed as Cessna Citation M2 are powered by improved FJ44-1AP-21 turbofans offering 10 to 15% more cruise thrust and up to 5% more hot-and-high thrust, and are equipped with modern Garmin G3000 avionics replacing Rockwell Collins Pro Line 21. Launched in September 2011, it is based on the then out-of-production CJ1 variant and features a new cabin layout and a more efficient FJ44 version. The initial M2 prototype first flew on 9 March 2012; it was not a conforming airframe but was testing the Garmin G3000 avionics and Williams FJ44-1AP-21 turbofans while another aircraft was expected to join the certification program in May 2012 to be used for aerodynamics testing. The wing is  wider due to small winglets. It climbs to FL 410 in 24 min, 27% faster than its closest competitor, where it is  faster than the Embraer Phenom 100E. With 150 produced since introduction in 2013, it became Cessna's entry-level jet after the Citation Mustang ended production in May 2017. The 250th M2 was delivered on June 15, 2020. In 2022, its equipped price was $5.855M.

Model 525A

The ICAO aircraft type designator for the CJ2 models is C25A.

CitationJet CJ2

Model 525A serial numbers 0001 to 0299, marketed as the CitationJet CJ2 is a 5-foot stretch of the CJ1 (Model 525) powered by Williams FJ44-2C turbofans and first delivered in 2000.
CitationJet CJ2+

Model 525A serial numbers 0300 and higher, marketed as the CitationJet CJ2+ and first delivered in April 2006, offer increased performance with updated avionics and Williams FJ44-3A-24 turbofans with FADEC control, with 4-passenger NBAA IFR range increased to 1550 nmi, maximum cruise speed of 413 kn, and decreased runway requirements; many features such as TCAS and TAWS were made standard.

CitationJet CJ2+ Alpine Edition
In 2014, Cessna started offering an upgrade package for the CJ2+ called Alpine Edition. It incorporates Garmin G3000 avionics and new cabin stylings similar to those introduced by Cessna to the CJ1+ when it became the M2. In 2012, the CJ2+ unit cost US$7.044M. The CJ2 went out of production due to low demand in January 2016.

Model 525B

The ICAO aircraft type designator for the CJ3 models is C25B.

CitationJet CJ3

Model 525B are marketed as the CitationJet CJ3 are a further stretch of the CJ2 powered by Williams FJ44-3A turbofans. Unveiled at the September 2002 National Business Aviation Association convention, it first flew on April 17, 2003, was FAA certified in October 2004 and deliveries began in December of that year. The cockpit with Rockwell Collins avionics is designed for single-pilot operation but can accommodate two crew members. Its customizable cabin typically has six club seats in a center-style configuration with an accessible in flight baggage compartment and external baggage access.
 Between its production debut in late 2004 and spring 2018, 500 of CJ3s and CJ3+s were delivered; 2004-2009 models are sold for $3.5 million and $5.0-5.5 million for 2009-2014 models.
 Hourly, CJ3 burns , its engine maintenance cost $313.60, its parts $251.72 and labor cost is $298.

CitationJet CJ3+

The CitationJet CJ3+ is an upgraded version of the CJ3. The aircraft received FAA certification in 2014. The flight deck of CJ3+ is upgraded to use Garmin G3000 avionics, and its cabin has M2-style seats with foldable armrests. In 2022, its equipped price was $9.915M.

Model 525C

The ICAO aircraft type designator for the CJ4 models is C25C.

Cessna Citation CJ4

 The stretched CJ4 was launched at the October 2006 NBAA conference. Its wing design comes from the moderately swept wing of the Citation Sovereign. Powered by Williams FJ44-4A turbofans, it has a maximum range of 2,165 nmi (4,010 km). Its cabin is 21 inches longer than the CJ3 and can seat up to nine people plus one in the cockpit. It first lifted off on May 5, 2008, from McConnell Air Force Base in Wichita, Kansas and first deliveries started in 2010.

 In 2011, the Federal Aviation Administration temporarily grounded the CJ4 and issued an airworthiness directive because of fires in the original Lithium-ion battery equipment.

 It can carry a  payload with full fuel, cruise up to FL450 and takeoff from  field on a standard day.

 Maintenance is $269 per hour for labor and $370 per hour for parts excluding the engine maintenance plan is $317 per hour for a 5,000 h TBO.

 By June 2019, early models are $5.5-5.8 million for resale and up to over $7 million for later ones.
 Compared to the CJ4, the CJ3+ offers almost as much range, but carries fewer passengers with full tanks and is slower, while the Embraer Phenom 300 has better fuel efficiency and more tanks-full payload.
 The 300th CJ4 was delivered in June 2019. In 2022, its equipped price was $11.29M.

Specifications

See also

References

Notes

Bibliography

External links

 
 
 
 
 
 
 
 
 

CitationJet
1990s United States business aircraft
Twinjets
Low-wing aircraft
CitationJet
T-tail aircraft
Aircraft first flown in 1991

no:Cessna 525 CitationJet